Slobodan Selenić (Serbian Cyrillic: Слободан Селенић; 7 June 1933 – 27 October 1995) was a Serbian writer, literary critic, dramatist, academic and university professor of 20th century literature.

One of the main themes in his work is the destruction of the civic class from Kingdom of Yugoslavia, its values and later destruction with the formation of the second Yugoslavia. He became the director of Avala Film at the age of 29. The Slobodan Selenić Award is annually awarded in his honour for the best graduate work at his alma mater.

He won the NIN literary prize in 1980 and was Belgrade's Poet Laureate.

Works 
His works include:
Avangardna drama, anthology (1964) 
Angažman u dramskoj formi (1965)
Memoari Pere Bogalja (1968)
Dramski pravci XX vijeka (1971) 
Pismo glava (1972) 
Antologija savremene srpske drame, anthology (1977)
Prijatelji (1980)
Kosančićev vijenac 7 (1982) 
Očevi i oci (1985); English translation, Fathers and Forefathers, Ellen Elias-Bursac, tr. (The Harvill Press, 2003)
Ruženje naroda (1987) 
Timor mortis (1989)
Knez Pavle (1991)
Ubistvo s predumišljajem, novel and screenplay for film (1993); English translation, Premeditated Murder,  Jelena Petrovic, tr. (The Harvill Press, 1997)
Iskorak u stvarnost (1995) 
Dramski pravci XX vijeka (2003)
Malajsko ludilo (2003)
Dramsko doba (2005)

References 

1933 births
1995 deaths
People from Pakrac
Serbs of Croatia
20th-century Serbian writers
Serbian male writers
Serbian novelists
Serbian literary critics
Serbian dramatists and playwrights
Serbian non-fiction writers
University of Belgrade Faculty of Dramatic Arts alumni
Academic staff of the University of Belgrade
Male non-fiction writers